Mark Kramer (born November 3, 1945) is a Philadelphia-born jazz pianist, composer, arranger, and producer/engineer.  His numerous recordings/ productions are often listed under  "The Mark Kramer Trio."  However, many works with acclaimed jazz bassist Eddie Gómez  are listed under "Eddie Gómez and Mark Kramer" or simply "Eddie Gómez".  These are significant signature co-productions.

Members of the Philadelphia Orchestra mentored him on violin from the age of five.   His early jazz performances, in his teens and twenties, included those with Michael Brecker and Randy Brecker, Charles Fambrough,  Stanley Clarke, and Eric Gravatt.

Over the next decades his trio went on to record a series of specialty productions including:

 the largest known body of jazz renditions of complete Broadway shows, including Evita en Jazz (distributed internationally by Telarc International records), The Sound of Music/Jazz, Jazz Fiddler on the Roof, The King and I, Rent, Sophisticated Ladies, and others;
 a reharmonization and recording of an entire symphony by a jazz trio: Mozart's Symphony no. 40 in G minor K. 550 (Eroica label);
 jazz versions of principal themes from the John Williams score of Harry Potter and the Sorcerer's Stone (Eroica label);
 a compilation of jazz renditions of the music of The Rolling Stones.

Thus, to date, the main part of Kramer's musical career has been as an arranger and leader of his own trios.

In addition, from the late -1980s his collaboration with co-leader - legendary bassist Eddie Gómez - has produced a far-ranging catalog of duo and trio recordings, including the Art of the Heart on Art of Life Records(released May 2006.)  Some of these recordings are reminiscent of those produced by pianist Bill Evans.

References

External links
https://musicians.allaboutjazz.com/markkramer  official biography
https://web.archive.org/web/20160303195455/http://www.concordmusicgroup.com/artists/Mark-Kramer/
https://mark-kramer.com/

1945 births
American jazz pianists
American male pianists
Central High School (Philadelphia) alumni
Living people
Musicians from Philadelphia
20th-century American pianists
Jazz musicians from Pennsylvania
21st-century American pianists
20th-century American male musicians
21st-century American male musicians
American male jazz musicians